Lodygin is a Russian masculine surname, its feminine counterpart is Lodygina. It may refer to
Alexander Lodygin (1847–1923), Russian electrical engineer and inventor
Lodygin (crater) on the Moon named after Alexander Lodygin
Yuri Lodygin (born 1990), Russian-Greek football goalkeeper

Russian-language surnames